Deanna Gumpf is an American softball coach who is the current head coach at Notre Dame.

Early life and education
Gumpf was born in La Palma, California. She attended the University of Nebraska where she studied business management while being a member of the softball team.

Coaching career

Notre Dame
Gumpf has been the head coach for Notre Dame since the 2002 softball season. She has led Notre Dame to 21 consecutive NCAA regional appearances. She is the all-time winningest softball coach in Notre Dame softball history. She is one of two coaches in Notre Dame athletics history to win more than 750 games as the leader of their program.

Personal life
Gumpf lives with her husband John and two children Brady and Tatum. John was selected by the Minnesota Twins in the second round of the 1989 Major League Baseball Draft and was on the softball coaching staff with Deanna at Notre Dame before joining the Notre Dame baseball staff. Brady also played baseball for Notre Dame.

Head coaching record

College
References:

References

Living people
Female sports coaches
American softball coaches
Nebraska Cornhuskers softball players
Long Beach State Beach softball coaches
Notre Dame Fighting Irish softball coaches
Year of birth missing (living people)